Latta Downtown Historic District is a national historic district located at Latta, Dillon County, South Carolina. The district encompasses 13 contributing buildings in the central business district of Latta.  The buildings were erected between about 1895 and 1928. They include buildings that housed a variety of mercantile establishments such as grocery stores, drugstores, a hotel, two banks, and several dry goods stores concentrated in a block east of the railroad on Main Street. Notable buildings include the Parham Building, McMillan Building, Cox Building, and Kornblut's Department Store.

It was listed on the National Register of Historic Places in 1998.

References

Historic districts on the National Register of Historic Places in South Carolina
Buildings and structures in Dillon County, South Carolina
National Register of Historic Places in Dillon County, South Carolina